NWD may refer to:

 Norwood Junction railway station in south London (Station code)
 New World Development, a Hong Kong company
 NW-D series Walkman, a flash-based line of Walkman from Sony
 Northwestern Division of the United States Army Corps of Engineers
 Non-working day, a term used in flexible working arrangements